Phoebe hainesiana (literally, "tree king" or "wood king") is a species of tree in the family Lauraceae, native to India. It is the state tree of Manipur.

References

hainesiana
Symbols of Manipur